Tricorn Peak is a snow-covered peak, 2,320 m, on the ridge between Astro Glacier and Skua Glacier in the north part of the Miller Range. Seen by the northern party of the New Zealand Geological Survey Antarctic Expedition (NZGSAE) (1961–62) and so named because of its resemblance to a three-cornered hat.

Mountains of Oates Land